Șerban Ionescu (23 September 1950 – 21 November 2012) was a Romanian actor, born in Corabia, Olt County.

Ionescu was diagnosed with ALS in 2011 and died at Floreasca Emergency Hospital in Bucharest on 21 November 2012.

Filmography
 Ion: Blestemul pământului, blestemul iubirii (1979) 
 Capcana mercenarilor (1981)
 Lumini și umbre (TV, 1981)
 Lumini și umbre: Partea II (TV, 1982)
 Imposibila iubire (1983)
 Acasă (1984)
 Furtună în Pacific (1985)
 Marele premiu (1985) 
 Bătălia din umbră (1986)
 Pădurea (1986)
 Pădureanca (1987)
 Martori dispăruți (1988)
 Mircea (1989)
 Lacrima cerului (1989)
 Cezara (1991)
 Începutul adevărului (Oglinda) (1994)
 Prea târziu (1996)
 Aerisirea (TV, 1998)
 Față în față (1999)
 Maria (2003) – Ion
 Sindromul Timișoara – Manipularea (2004)
 "15" (2005)
 Cuscrele (serial TV, 2005) - Mihai (Mișu) Casapu
 Azucena – Îngerul de abanos (2005) 
 Om sărac, om bogat (serial TV, 2006)
 Happy End (2006) – senatorul Costea
 De ce eu? (2006) 
 Visuri otrăvite (2006) 
 Păcală se întoarce (2006) 
 Anticamera (serial TV, 2008)
 Dincolo de America (2008) 
 Fetele marinarului (serial TV, 2008) 
 Pac! Ești mort''  (2009)

References

External links

1950 births
2012 deaths
People from Corabia
Romanian male film actors
Deaths from motor neuron disease
Neurological disease deaths in Romania
Burials at Bellu Cemetery